Robertson Airfield , licensed according to South African Civil Aviation Authority standards, is an unmanned municipal airport situated 1 km to the east of the Western Cape town of Robertson in South Africa.

Robertson Airfield is located 1 km to the east of the town of Robertson in the Western Cape Province on South Africa's Route 62.

See also

 Skydive Robertson

External links
 Skydive Robertson web site
 Robertson Flying Club web site

References

Airports in South Africa
Transport in the Western Cape
Cape Winelands District Municipality